The Vultee Aircraft Corporation was an aircraft manufacturer founded in 1939 in Los Angeles County, California, when the Vultee Aircraft Division of the aviation holding company AVCO was reorganized as an independent company. It had limited success before merging with the Consolidated Aircraft Corporation in 1943, to form the Consolidated Vultee Aircraft Corporation − or Convair.

History

Gerard "Jerry" Freebairn Vultee (1900–1938) and Vance Breese (1904–1973) started the Airplane Development Corporation in early 1932  after American Airlines showed great interest in their six-passenger V-1 design. Soon after, Errett Lobban (E.L.) Cord bought all 500 shares of stock in the company and the Airplane Development Corporation became a Cord subsidiary.

AVCO subsidiary
Due to the Air Mail Act of  1934, AVCO established the Aviation Manufacturing Corporation (AMC) on November 30, 1934 through the acquisition of Cord's holdings, including Vultee's Airplane Development Corporation. AMC was liquidated on January 1, 1936 and Vultee Aircraft Division was formed as an autonomous subsidiary of AVCO.

Jerry Vultee was named vice president and chief engineer. Vultee acquired the assets of the defunct AMC, including Lycoming Engines and Stinson Aircraft Company.

Meanwhile, Vultee and Breese had redesigned the V-1 to meet American Airlines' needs and created the eight-passenger V-1A. American purchased 11 V-1As, but sales of the aircraft failed to materialize because regulations were introduced requiring that aircraft used on scheduled passenger routes have two engines, and the V-1 was of little interest to other operators and only 25 were built. Vultee then developed the V-11 attack aircraft using the wings and tail from the V-1, which received sizable orders, albeit almost all from foreign countries with 40 for Turkey, 30 for China, 26 for Brazil, and 4 for the Soviet Union, where an additional 31 were built under licence. Hoped for orders from the United States Army Air Corps failed to materialize beyond test samples though, as the USAAC had made the decision to use only twin engine attack aircraft. This led to the development of the improved V-12, but aside from the prototype, all of these were sold to China, including three completed aircraft and 75 as knockdown kits of which at least 25 were assembled before Japanese troops overran the facility where they were being assembled.

By 1937, Vultee headed his own factory in Downey, California, with more than a million dollars in orders for V-1s, V-1As, and V-11s.

In 1938, before Vultee become independent again, Jerry Vultee and his wife Sylvia Parker, daughter of Twentieth Century Fox film director Max Parker, died in late January when the plane he was piloting crashed in a snowstorm near Sedona, Arizona. 

A bronze plaque memorializing the Vultees is located near the crash site at the end of Coconino Forestry and Vultee Arch Trails, where a natural rock arch named for them, the Vultee Arch, is located.  Donald P. Smith, Vultee's close friend and vice president of Vultee Aircraft, wrote a letter to TIME magazine about Vultee's death:

<blockquote>Sirs:

'Gerard F. Vultee ("Jerry"), not Gerald, my close friend and business associate for many years, was killed when the cabin monoplane he was flying with Mrs. Vultee crashed on the flat top of Wilson Mountain [TIME, Feb. 7]. ... Caught in a local snow-storm and blizzard with no training in blind or instrument flying, he was unable to find his way out. The fire occurred after the crash, not before.DON P. SMITH Vice PresidentVultee Aircraft Los Angeles, Calif.</blockquote>

AVCO hired Dick Palmer away from Howard Hughes to take Jerry Vultee's place, and Vultee Aircraft Division began to develop military designs. Dick Palmer created the BT-13, BT-15, and SNV Valiant trainers and oversaw other major production program such as the V-72 Vengeance, serving in the USAAC as the A-31 and A-35.

Independent company
Vultee Aircraft was created in November 1939, when Vultee Aircraft Division of AVCO was reorganized as an independent company.

The P-66 Vanguard was a  1941 fighter program that was intended for Sweden that was inherited by the USAAC, Great Britain and finally, China. The P-66 had a mediocre combat record in China and was out of service by 1943. The XP-54 fighter project  was the last Vultee Aircraft design, but only two examples were built.Parker, Dana T. Building Victory: Aircraft Manufacturing in the Los Angeles Area in World War II, pp. 107–120, Cypress, CA, 2013. .

Vultee was the first company to build aircraft on a powered assembly line, and the first to use women workers in production-line positions.

Merger
On March 17, 1943, Consolidated and Vultee merged, creating Consolidated Vultee Aircraft Corporation, popularly known as Convair. The Vultee management resigned.Parker, Dana T. Building Victory: Aircraft Manufacturing in the Los Angeles Area in World War II, p. 114, Cypress, CA, 2013.

Timeline

 1929 Aviation Corporation (AVCO) holding company formed by multiple participants
 1932 Airplane Development Corporation formed by Gerard F. "Jerry" Vultee; Errett Lobban Cord soon takes it over
 1934 AVCO acquired the Airplane Development Corporation from Cord and formed the Aviation Manufacturing Corporation (AMC)
 1936 AMC liquidated to form the Vultee Aircraft Division, an autonomous subsidiary of AVCO
 1939 Vultee Aircraft Division of AVCO reorganized as an independent company known as Vultee Aircraft, Inc. 1941 Consolidated Aircraft Corporation sold to AVCO
 1942 Vultee acquires Intercontinent Aircraft Corporation
 1943 Consolidated Vultee Aircraft Corporation', generally known as Convair, formed by the merger of Consolidated Aircraft and Vultee Aircraft; still controlled by AVCO
 1947 Convair acquired by the Atlas Corporation
 1953 (or 1954) Convair acquired by General Dynamics
 1985 General Dynamics formed the "Space Systems Division" from the Convair Space Program
 1993 Lockheed Corporation acquires General Dynamics' Fort Worth aircraft division, builder of the F-16 Fighting Falcon.
 1994 Space Systems Division sold to Martin Marietta
 1994 Convair Aircraft Structures unit sold to McDonnell Douglas
 1997 McDonnell Douglas sold to Boeing

Aircraft

References
Notes

Bibliography

 McKillop, Jack. "Vultee SNV Valiant." Brown-Shoe Navy: U.S. Naval Aviation. Retrieved: January 6, 2006.
 Parker, Dana T. Building Victory: Aircraft Manufacturing in the Los Angeles Area in World War II, Cypress, CA, 2013. .
 Rumerman, Joel. "Consolidated Vultee Aircraft Corporation." US Centennial of Flight Commission, 2003. Retrieved: January 6, 2006.
 Thompson, Jonathan. Vultee Aircraft 1932–1947. Santa Ana, CA; Narkiewicz/Thompson, 1992. .
 "The Vultee V-1A" Golden Age of Aviation E-column, Retrieved: 6 January 2006.
 Yenne, Bill. Convair Deltas from Sea Dart to Hustler.'' North Branch, MN: Specialty Press, 2009. .

External links

Info & Fotos of various Vultee Aircraft.
Additional info & fotos about Jerry Vultee & Vultee Aircraft.
Textron Lycoming Turbine Engine, a  Company History of AVCO and Lycoming/Textron
Avco Financial Services, Inc. from the Lehman Brothers Collection – Twentieth Century Business Archives
Consolidated Vultee Aircraft Corporation, U.S. Centennial of Flight Commission
General Dynamics Corporation, U.S. Centennial of Flight Commission
Central Manufacturing Co. of Connersville, Indiana, a history of Cord, AVCO, and others

Defunct aircraft manufacturers of the United States
Companies based in Los Angeles County, California
Downey, California
Historic American Engineering Record in California
American companies established in 1939
Manufacturing companies established in 1939
Manufacturing companies disestablished in 1943
1939 establishments in California
1943 disestablishments in California
Defunct manufacturing companies based in Greater Los Angeles
1943 mergers and acquisitions